Mildred Christina Akosiwor Fugar also known as Mildred Ankrah (12 June 1938 – 9 June 2005) was a First Lady of Ghana and wife to Joseph Arthur Ankrah. She had been brought up in the Belgian Congo and the Gold Coast, and after her husband's rise to head of state of Ghana, she worked in social and religious work.

Biography 
She was born on 12 June 1938 in Luluabourg, Belgian Congo (now Kananga, Democratic Republic of the Congo); to Mr Benoni Kwaku Fugar, a Ghanaian and Mrs Pauline Isombe Edembe Fugar, a Congolese citizen. She was the fourth of seven children. Fugar started school at Keta Roman Catholic Convent in the Gold Coast (now Ghana), where she also completed middle school in 1957 and then continued to the Universal Commercial College, Somanya. Mildred began to work at the Central Revenue Department, now the Ghana Internal Revenue Service, after successful completion of her course at Universal Commercial College.

She met General Joseph Arthur Ankrah for the first time in 1962 after her sister Florence went to Burma Camp to join the auxiliary corps of the Ghanaian Army. Florence saw two high ranking army officials and asked them to direct her to the "boss of the army" so that she could submit her application. Ankrah was so taken by her that he escorted her back home to her family, where he met Fugar. They were engaged in 1965 and later married.

Following the coup d'état which led to a change of government on 24 February 1966, and the rise of Ankrah to head of state of Ghana and chairman of the National Liberation Council, Fugar became First Lady of Ghana. She worked heavily in social and religious work.

Death 

References 

1938 births
2005 deaths
First ladies of Ghana
People from Kananga